Konijerala is a village and is the headquarters of one of the 46 mandals in Khammam district, Telangana of India.

See also
Botlakunta

References 

Villages in Khammam district